Black Label is the first extended play by South Korean girl group Fiestar. The album was released digitally and physically on March 4, 2015. The album contains six tracks with the lead single, "You're Pitiful".

Background and release
In February 2015, LOEN Entertainment launched the band's official that the group would debut with the mini-album "Black Label" and title-track "You're Pitiful". The track is described as a 'balad' track with elements of dream, and dance.

First teaser is posted on February 25, 2015. Second teaser is posted on March 1, 2015. On March 4, the song's music video were released online. The group also released a dance practice on March 9, 2015. Special "Performance Version" was released on March 11, 2015.

Promotion
Fiestar held a live showcase on March 4, where they performed "You're Pitiful" along with other tracks.

The group started promoting their title track "You're Pitiful" on music shows on March 4. They first performed the songs on Mnet's M! Countdown, followed by performances on KBS' Music Bank, MBC's Show! Music Core and SBS's Inkigayo.

Track listing

2015 EPs
K-pop EPs